The Big Blockade is a 1942 British black-and-white war propaganda film in the style of dramatised documentary. It is directed by Charles Frend and stars Will Hay, Leslie Banks, Michael Redgrave and John Mills. It was produced by Michael Balcon for Ealing Studios, in collaboration with the Ministry of Economic Warfare.

At one stage, the film was known as Siege.

Plot
This is a propaganda film in which the British strategy of the economic blockade of Nazi Germany is illustrated through a series of scenes and sketches, combined with documentary footage.

Although released in 1942 it was largely made in 1941 so part of the story is complaint of America's non-involvement.

Main cast

Leslie Banks as Taylor, Civil Service
Michael Redgrave as a Russian on the train
Will Hay as Skipper, Merchant Navy
Bernard Miles as Mate, Royal Navy
Michael Rennie as George, Royal Air Force
John Mills as Tom, Royal Air Force
Frank Cellier as Schneider
Robert Morley as the senior Nazi Official, von Geiselbrecht
Alfred Drayton as Direktor
Marius Goring as German propaganda officer
Austin Trevor as U-boat Captain
Morland Graham as Civil Servant  
Albert Lieven as Gunter  
John Stuart as Naval officer  
Joss Ambler as Stoltenhoff  
Michael Wilding as Captain 
George Woodbridge as Quisling  
Quentin Reynolds as American journalist
Elliott Mason as German stationmistress
Peter De Greef as RAF airman

The film's commentary is made by the journalist and former Liberal MP Frank Owen.

Release
The film premiered at the London Pavilion on 19 January 1942, and the premiere was attended by a group of members of Parliament interested in economic warfare. The film was not well received by The Times, whose critic in 1942 found that "this particular hotch-potch is, as propaganda, woefully unconvincing. It is splendid to give audiences a glimpse of the devoted work done by the Services […] but actors got up as comic Nazi business men distort the lessons the more serious parts of the film are trying to drive home", and modern film reviewers are not very much kinder to it.

References

External links
 
 
 Dr Keith M. Johnston: The Great Ealing Film Challenge 65: The Big Blockade (1942)

1942 films
1940s war comedy-drama films
British war comedy-drama films
British World War II propaganda films
British black-and-white films
Seafaring films
Films set in England
Films set in Denmark
Films set in Germany
Films set in Hungary
Films set in London
Films set in Norway
Ealing Studios films
Films produced by Michael Balcon
Films directed by Charles Frend
Films scored by Richard Addinsell
1942 war films
1942 drama films
British World War II films
1940s English-language films